Blackrod was, from 1872 to 1974, a local government district centred on the village of Blackrod in the administrative county of Lancashire, England.

History
Blackrod was a township and chapelry in the civil and ecclesiastical parish of Bolton le Moors in the Salford Hundred of Lancashire. The township became part of the Wigan Poor Law Union on 1 February 1837 which took responsibility for funding the Poor Law within that Union area. In 1866, Blackrod was given the status of a civil parish.

A resolution for the adoption of the Local Government Act 1858 was passed on 9 May 1872 by the owners and ratepayers of the township of Blackrod, and a local board was created to provide  for the water supply and drainage of the township. After the Public Health Act 1875 was passed by Parliament in that year, Blackrod Local Board assumed extra duties as an urban sanitary district, although the Local Board's title did not change.

Following the implementation of the Local Government Act 1894, Blackrod Local Board was transformed into an elected urban district council of nine members. Blackrod Urban District Council had three electoral wards: Central, North, and South, each represented by three councillors.

Under the Local Government Act 1972, Blackrod Urban District was abolished on 1 April 1974 and its former area became a successor parish in the Metropolitan Borough of Bolton in Greater Manchester.

Demography

Lists of office holders

Chairmen of Blackrod Local Board

Chairmen of Blackrod Urban District Council

Notes

Urban districts of England
Local government in the Metropolitan Borough of Bolton
History of Lancashire
Local Government Districts created by the Local Government Act 1858
Districts of England created by the Local Government Act 1894
Districts of England abolished by the Local Government Act 1972
Blackrod